Norala, officially the Municipality of Norala, is a 3rd class municipality in the province of South Cotabato, Philippines. According to the 2020 census, it has a population of 46,682 people.

History
Norala was created from portions of Dulawan, through Executive Order No. 572 signed by President Elpidio Quirino on March 10, 1953.

Geography

Barangays
Norala is subdivided into 14 barangays.
 Dumaguil
 Esperanza
 Kibid
 Lapuz
 Liberty
 Lopez Jaena
 Matapol
 Poblacion
 Puti
 San Jose
 San Miguel
 Simsiman
 Tinago
 Benigno Aquino, Jr.

Climate

Demographics

Economy

References

External links
Norala Profile at PhilAtlas.com
Norala Profile at the DTI Cities and Municipalities Competitive Index
[ Philippine Standard Geographic Code]
Philippine Census Information

Municipalities of South Cotabato
Establishments by Philippine executive order